Sam Raben (born May 11, 1997) is an American soccer player who plays as a defender. He won a gold medal with Team USA in the 2017 Maccabiah Games in Israel. Before turning pro, he played two seasons in the Premier Development League with Colorado Rapids U-23. In January 2019 the Colorado Rapids of Major League Soccer signed Raben to a guaranteed contract.

Early life
Raben was born in Birmingham, Alabama, to David and Carrie Raben, and is Jewish. His father is an oncologist at the University of Colorado. His sister Lizzy played soccer for Duke University. His hometown is Greenwood Village, Colorado.

Soccer career
Raben plays soccer as a defender. He attended Cherry Creek High School. He was second team All-State and All-Conference in 2012.

He played for Wake Forest University. Raben made 91 starts for Wake Forest, tied for third-most in school history. In 2018, he was named third team All-ACC and third team All-South Region by United Soccer Coaches.

Raben played center back in soccer for Team USA in the 2017 Maccabiah Games in Israel, winning a gold medal. He was on the Jewish Sports Review 2017 Division 1 Men's Soccer All-America Team, along with Jake Rozhansky and Harry Swartz.

Before turning pro, Raben played two seasons in the Premier Development League with Colorado Rapids U-23.

In January 2019, the Colorado Rapids of Major League Soccer signed Raben to a guaranteed contract.

On February 26, 2020, Raben signed with USL Championship side Sporting Kansas City II after going on trial with them in the preseason. Raben was released by Sporting Kansas City on November 30, 2020.

References

External links
Wake Forest profile

Living people
1997 births
American soccer players
Soccer players from Birmingham, Alabama
Greenwood Village, Colorado
Association football defenders
Wake Forest Demon Deacons men's soccer players
Colorado Rapids U-23 players
Colorado Rapids players
Colorado Springs Switchbacks FC players
Sporting Kansas City II players
USL League Two players
USL Championship players
Competitors at the 2017 Maccabiah Games
Maccabiah Games medalists in football
Maccabiah Games gold medalists for the United States
Jewish American sportspeople
Jewish footballers
Homegrown Players (MLS)
21st-century American Jews